Konrad Ruhland (19 February 1932 – 14 March 2010) was a German musicologist. He was born in Landau am Inn (Germany/Bavaria)

He studied history, medieval Latin, theology, and liturgical history which helped him to gain extensive background knowledge for his musicological research. Under the Ruhland's leadership, a group of enthusiastic students in Munich formed a "Capella Antiqua" in 1956:  known as the Capella Antiqua Munchen, this group was one of the first to tackle the problems of reviving Early Baroque and Renaissance music using a scholarly approach.

Until his death Ruhland continued to communicate his theoretical knowledge and the practical experience to students in numerous courses, music weeks and summer schools, including the summer school at the University of Philadelphia. He was also a much sought-after choir director and had extensive experience in this field.

Discography
 Paschale Mysterium

German musicologists
1932 births
2010 deaths
Officers Crosses of the Order of Merit of the Federal Republic of Germany
Winter & Winter Records artists
Writers from Munich